WKET (98.3 FM) is a radio station broadcasting an Album Oriented Rock format. Licensed to Kettering, Ohio, United States, it serves the Kettering area. The station is owned by Kettering City School District and is operated by the students at Kettering Fairmont High School. It was launched in May of 1975 by Fairmont West students Matthew Smith and Chuck Hamlin.

External links
 

KET
Radio stations established in 1975